Ianculeşti may refer to several villages in Romania:

 Ianculeşti, a village in Șuici Commune, Argeș County
 Ianculeşti, a village in Stoeneşti Commune, Giurgiu County
 Ianculeşti, a village in the town of Carei, Satu Mare County